Kalateh-ye Qassab (also Romanized as Kalāteh-ye Qaşşāb and Kalāteh Qaşşāb; also known as Kalāt-e Qaşşāb) is a village in Khusf Rural District, Central District, Khusf County, South Khorasan Province, Iran. At the 2006 census, its population was 16, in 5 families.

References 

Populated places in Khusf County